Sweet Dreams: The Anthology is a compilation album by American guitarist and blues musician Roy Buchanan. The double CD contains released as well as previously unreleased recordings, live and studio. According to Mike Joyce, who reviewed the album in The Washington Post, it "presents the good, the bad and the unreleased from Buchanan's tenure with the Polydor and Atlantic labels." The anthology is part of PolyGram's "Chronicles" retrospective series.

Track listing
All tracks composed by Roy Buchanan; except where indicated
Disc one

Disc two

 Tracks 1.01 to 1.04 outtakes from unreleased debut album, recorded between 1969 and 71 (vocals on "The Story of Isaac" by Charlie Daniels)
 Tracks 1.05 to 1.07 from the album Roy Buchanan 
 Tracks 1.08 to 1.10 from the album Second Album
 Tracks 1.12 & 1.13 from the album That's What I am Here For 
 Tracks 1.14 & 1.15 from the album Rescue Me / In The Beginning
 Tracks 2.02 & 2.03 from the album Live Stock 
 Tracks 2.04 & 2.05 from the album A Street Called Straight 
 Track 2.06 from the album Loading Zone 
 Tracks 2.07 & 2.08 from the album Live in Japan 
 Tracks 2.09 & 2.10 from the album You're Not Alone
 Tracks 1.11, 2.01 & 2.11 previously unreleased, mixed at PolyGram Studios

Critical reception

Lindsay Planer, in a review on Allmusic, writes in a review that gives the album 4.5 out of 5 stars, "until Buchanan's catalog is given a thorough overhaul, Sweet Dreams: The Anthology (1992) is a satisfying overview of the man once dubbed 'The Best Unknown Guitarist in the World.'" Mike Joyce of the Washington Post was most impressed with "a gorgeous guitar reading of 'Sweet Dreams,'" besides the live songs, especially "an expansive and expressive version of Neil Young's 'Down by the River' (featuring Billy Price on vocals)."

References

Roy Buchanan albums
1992 compilation albums
Polydor Records compilation albums